Křenovice may refer to:

 Křenovice (Přerov District)
 Křenovice (Písek District)
 Křenovice (Vyškov District)